Sulaiman Abdul-Karim Mohammed Al-Fahim is an Emirati television personality and businessman in the UAE real estate sector. He was involved in the deal in which the Abu Dhabi royal family obtained Manchester City F.C.

Early life and education
Al-Fahim was born in Dubai in 1977. He obtained his master's degree from Kogod School of Business, American University in Washington, D.C., USA. His MBA was in Finance and Real Estate. He has claimed that he has a PhD in Real Estate from American University, but there is no record of him earning a PhD from the school and the school does not even offer a PhD in real estate. Nonetheless, Al-Fahim uses the honorific "Dr."

In 1998, Al Fahim lost his parents and brother in a car accident.

Career

Al-Fahim heads the real estate company Hydra Properties, which is owned by the Royal Group, an investment conglomerate headed by Tahnoun bin Zayed Al Nahyan, a member of the royal family in Abu Dhabi.

Al Fahim was president of UAE Chess Federation from 2008 until 2012. Al Fahim published the book Brand Builder. Al-Fahim was the founder and host of a business themed reality television show Hydra Executives which was launched in Spring 2008. It had a run of two seasons.

Manchester City F.C.
Sulaiman Al Fahim was involved in the deal in which the Abu Dhabi royal family took over Manchester City in 2008. He looked at various clubs on behalf of the Abu Dhabi royal family and suggested that they buy Manchester City. Al Fahim signed the first agreement (Memorandum of Understanding) with Mr Pairoj who was the legal representative of the former Prime Minister of Thailand, Thaksin Shinawatra, who owned Manchester City. Al Fahim then presented the offer to Abu Dhabi United Group where Mansour bin Zayed Al Nahyan took the final agreement forward and took over Manchester City.

Portsmouth F.C.
In 2009, Al-Fahim owned Portsmouth F.C. for six weeks. In 2018, Al Fahim  was convicted and sentenced to five years in jail for stealing £5 million from his wife to fund the purchase of Portsmouth. In the aftermath of Al-Fahim's brief stint at Portsmouth, the Premier League tightened its rules on ownership.

Technology
Sulaiman Al-Fahim founded Sustain.Exchange in March 2019. It’s a cryptocurrency exchange and 
listing platform that complies with Shariah regulation, allowing 1.8 billion Muslims around the world to 
accumulate and trade digital assets.

References

1977 births
Living people
Kogod School of Business alumni
Emirati chess players
Emirati pharmacists
Emirati television presenters
Emirati businesspeople in real estate
Emirati football chairmen and investors
Manchester City F.C. directors and chairmen
Portsmouth F.C. directors and chairmen
Emirati chief executives